Agostino Lanzillo (31 October 1886 – 3 March 1952) was an Italian revolutionary syndicalist leader who later became a member of Benito Mussolini's fascist movement.

Early life
Agostino Lanzillo was born in Reggio Calabria on 31 October 1886 to Salvatore and Giuseppina (Cosile) Lanzillo. Agostino attended primary school and secondary school in his hometown. He acquired a law degree from the University of Rome and wrote his thesis on the socialist Pierre-Joseph Proudhon.

Political career

Revolutionary syndicalist period
Lanzillo was drawn to revolutionary syndicalism and became a follower of Georges Sorel. Lanzillo wrote: 

Lanzillo corresponded personally with Sorel, and published in 1910 the first biography of Sorel. Lanzillo also contributed to the syndicalist journals Avanguardia Socialista and Il divenire sociale.

National syndicalist period
In 1909, Georges Sorel started collaborating with the French nationalist-monarchist movement Action Française, creating national syndicalism. While many in the Italian Left attacked Sorel and reproached him for his close links with Action Française, Italian revolutionary syndicalists supported Sorel. Lanzillo, for example, defended his master in a series of articles published in Il divenire sociale. Later, Lanzillo wrote to the national syndicalist journal La lupa. From 1912, Lanzillo published under Benito Mussolini editorship, contributing to Avanti!, Utopia and Il Popolo d'Italia.

Fascist period
Lanzillo was among the founders of the fascist movement, and was a member of National Fascist Party.

Lanzillo was a member of Italian Chamber of Deputies (a house of Italian Parliament), in the 27th parliamentary session (24 May 1924 – 21 January 1929).

Lanzillo was also a member of the one-party National Council of Corporations in 1931.

Academic career
In 1921 Lanzillo was a lecturer in political economy at University of Rome. In 1922 he became a professor of political economy at the Royal University of Milan and in 1923 he became a professor at the University of Cagliari. Later, Lanzillo was appointed rector of Royal Advanced Institute of Economics and Commerce in Venice.

Writings
La disfatta del socialismo: Critica della guerra e del socialismo. Florence: Libreria della Voce, 1919.
Le Mouvement ouvrier en Italie. Paris: Revière, n. d. [1910].

References

1886 births
1952 deaths
National syndicalists
National Fascist Party politicians
Sapienza University of Rome alumni
Academic staff of the Sapienza University of Rome
Academic staff of the University of Cagliari